Robert Dean Manfred Jr. (born September 28, 1958) is an American lawyer and business executive who is serving as the tenth commissioner of Major League Baseball. He previously served as MLB's chief operating officer. Manfred succeeded Bud Selig as commissioner on January 25, 2015.

Early life and career
Manfred was born on September 28, 1958, in Rome, New York. As a child, he played tennis, golf and baseball, opting to focus on tennis by his eighth grade year, which he continued to play through college at Le Moyne. He attended Rome Free Academy and graduated in 1976. Manfred enrolled at Le Moyne College from 1976 through 1978 before transferring to Cornell University. He earned his Bachelor of Science from Cornell's School of Industrial and Labor Relations in 1980 and his Juris Doctor from Harvard Law School in 1983, where he was an editor of the Harvard Law Review.

After law school, Manfred clerked for Judge Joseph L. Tauro of the U.S. District Court for the District of Massachusetts from 1983 to 1984. He then joined the law firm Morgan, Lewis & Bockius, where he worked in on labor and employment law.

Major League Baseball
In 1987, Manfred began working with Major League Baseball (MLB) during collective bargaining. During the 1994–95 MLB strike, he served as outside counsel for the owners. He joined MLB on a full-time basis in 1998, serving as the Executive Vice President of Economics and League Affairs. Manfred negotiated MLB's first drug testing agreement with the Major League Baseball Players Association (MLBPA) in 2002, and represented MLB in negotiations with the MLBPA when forming new collective bargaining agreements in 2002, 2006 and 2011. In 2013, Manfred led MLB's investigation of the Biogenesis scandal.

At the end of the 2013 season, Commissioner of Baseball Bud Selig promoted Manfred to chief operating officer of MLB. The position had been vacant since Bob DuPuy resigned in 2010. Following the announcement of Selig's retirement, effective after the 2014 season, Manfred became a finalist to succeed him as Commissioner.

On August 14, 2014, MLB owners elected Manfred to succeed Selig, beating Boston Red Sox chairman Tom Werner and MLB executive vice president of business Tim Brosnan. Manfred assumed office on January 25, 2015. He stated that his primary goals as commissioner were youth outreach, embracing technology, quickening the pace of play, strengthening player relations, and creating a more unified business operation.

As commissioner, Manfred instituted rules before the start of the 2015 season to address the pace of play, including having batters remain in the batter's box and the installation of time clocks to limit the time spent around commercial breaks. Before the 2018 season, Manfred introduced more rule changes to affect the pace of play, including reducing the time in commercial breaks and limiting player visits to the pitcher's mound. He has also advocated for expansion franchises, listing Portland, Las Vegas, Charlotte, Nashville, Montreal, and Vancouver as possible locations for new teams.

On November 15, 2018, the owners extended Manfred's contract through the 2024 season.

Houston Astros sign stealing scandal

In 2020, Manfred led an investigation that found that the Houston Astros had used illegal methods to steal signs during the 2017 season, in which they won the World Series, as well as part of the 2018 season. Manfred fined the team $5 million, the maximum allowed by the MLB constitution, and revoked their first- and second-round draft picks in 2020 and 2021. Astros manager A. J. Hinch and general manager Jeff Luhnow were each suspended for the entire 2020 season, including the playoffs. No Astros players were punished because they received immunity in exchange for their cooperation in the investigation.

Manfred was widely criticized for his handling of the situation. In an interview with ESPN, he defended his decision not to discipline players involved with the scandal, arguing that the Major League Baseball Players Association would not accept it. He also refused to strip the Astros of their 2017 World Series title because "It has never happened in baseball" and that he believed "that precedent happens and when you deviate from that, you have to have a very good reason." During this Manfred used the phrase "Hunk of Metal" to describe the Commissioner's Trophy. After many fans and players pushed back to the description, Manfred issued an apology, stating his intent was to make "a rhetorical point".

Impact of COVID-19 pandemic
On March 12, 2020, one day after the COVID-19 pandemic was declared by the World Health Organization, Major League Baseball cancelled spring training and delayed the start of the 2020 season by at least two weeks. Four days later, it was announced that the start of the season would be pushed back indefinitely due to the recommendation made by the CDC to restrict events of more than 50 people for eight weeks. On May 26, Manfred made the league's first proposal for the 2020 season, which included a reduction of the richest salaries by over 75 percent. This proposal was immediately rejected by the Players Association. The MLBPA later voted 33–5 to reject a proposal from Manfred and the owners for a 60-game season that would include an expanded postseason format and no provisions for salary guarantees in the event of a cancelled season, then rejected a third proposal for a 72-game season with 80% pro-rated pay. Manfred and the owners had also rejected the players' proposal for a 70-game season. On June 22, Manfred imposed a 60-game regular season that was unanimously approved by franchise owners. The season imposed by Manfred included the implementation of a sixteen-team postseason format, a universal designated hitter and extra innings beginning with a runner on second base.

2021 All-Star Game relocation
On April 2, 2021, Manfred announced that the 2021 All-Star Game would be moved from Atlanta in protest of a voting reform law passed by Georgia's legislature. The move was supported by President Joe Biden and the MLBPA, the latter of whom claimed that the law "disproportionately disenfranchises the Black community." The decision was opposed both by Republican state officials including governor Brian Kemp and by several prominent Georgia Democrats including activist and former gubernatorial candidate Stacey Abrams and senator Raphael Warnock. The Atlanta Braves also opposed the move remarking that they were "deeply disappointed" by Manfred's decision and "businesses, employees and fans in Georgia are the victims of this decision." On April 5, Manfred announced that Coors Field in Denver, Colorado, would host the All-Star Game.

2021–22 lockout

Following the expiration of the league's collective bargaining agreement in December 2021, team owners unanimously voted to enact a lockout at 12:01 a.m. EST on December 2, indefinitely lasting until a new CBA was signed. Manfred formally announced the lockout in a press release titled "A letter to baseball fans," an action that received criticism from various baseball media members. After several rounds of meetings between MLB and the Major League Baseball Players Association that were described as "unproductive," the league set February 28 as a deadline to complete negotiations at Roger Dean Stadium in Jupiter, Florida, or else regular season games would begin to be cancelled. MLB and the MLBPA worked late into the night on contract negotiations on February 28, ignoring the deadline and working into the early morning hours of March 1. Around 2:30 a.m. EST on March 1, the league decided that there was enough progress on negotiations to push the deadline to 5:00 p.m. on the same day. As negotiations began to resume on March 1, a players' union representative stated that the two sides were further apart on key issues than what was being reported and claimed that Manfred and MLB were pushing an overly-optimistic storyline for their own gain. Just before the 5:00 p.m. deadline, the league contingent made a final offer that was ultimately turned down by the players' union. As a result, Manfred announced in a press conference outside Roger Dean Stadium that a chunk of the season's first games (later revealed to be the first two series) would be cancelled. Manfred received online criticism for smiling and laughing before and during the press conference.

As negotiations continued, Manfred announced that March 8 was the new deadline for an agreement to be in place or else more games would be cancelled. After another marathon of negotiations beginning on March 8 and stretching into the early hours of March 9, the deadline was extended as it had been in the previous week's deadline meeting. The league and the players' union once again failed to come to an agreement by the extended deadline because of the last-second inclusion of an international player draft in the owners' proposal.  As a result, Manfred cancelled another two series, tentatively pushing the 2022 season's opening day to April 14. On March 10, Manfred and the league put the possibility of a 162-game season on the table if a deal could be met soon thereafter. That evening, the players' union accepted an MLB proposal that allowed the two sides to explore the international draft idea and come to decision on it by July 2022. The owners voted unanimously to ratify the agreement, ending the lockout. Manfred announced that opening day was being reverted back to April 7 and that the original first two series of the season would be played at later dates so that a full 162-game season could be conducted. In a subsequent press conference, Manfred said that he was relieved to see the lockout end and that he desired to improve his relationship with the players.

Personal life
Growing up in Central New York, Manfred was a fan of the New York Yankees. His father Rob Sr. led the Rome, New York, division of Revere Copper and Brass, while his mother Phyllis was a third grade teacher. He has an older sister and a younger brother.

Manfred and his wife, Colleen, have four children; Megan, Michael, Jane and Mary Clare. Megan married Timothy Petrella of Minnetonka, Minnesota, son of the president of UnitedHealthcare Community and State, at Immaculate Conception Catholic Church in Sleepy Hollow, New York.

Manfred serves as a board member at Catholic School of the Holy Child in Rye, New York.

References

External links

1958 births
Living people
People from Rome, New York
Major League Baseball commissioners
American chief operating officers
Catholics from New York (state)
College men's tennis players in the United States
Cornell University School of Industrial and Labor Relations alumni
Le Moyne College alumni
Harvard Law School alumni